Beariz is a municipality in Ourense (province) in the Galicia region of north-west Spain. It lies towards the very north-west of Ourense Province.  In 2016 the population was 1,003.

References  

Municipalities in the Province of Ourense